Cuju or Ts'u-chü is an ancient Chinese ball game. Cuju is the earliest known recorded game similar to football. It is a competitive game that involves kicking a ball through an opening into a net without the use of hands. Descriptions of the game date back to the Han dynasty, with a Chinese military work from the 3rd–2nd century BC describing it as an exercise. It was also played in other Asian countries like Korea, Japan and Vietnam.

History

The first mention of Cuju in a historical text is in the Warring States era Zhan Guo Ce, in the section describing the state of Qi. It is also described in Sima Qian's Records of the Grand Historian (under the Biography of Su Qin), written during the Han Dynasty. A competitive form of cuju was used as fitness training for military cavaliers, while other forms were played for entertainment in wealthy cities like Linzi.

During the Han Dynasty (206 BC – AD 220), the popularity of cuju spread from the army to the royal courts and upper classes. It is said that the Han emperor Wu Di enjoyed the sport. At the same time, cuju games were standardized and rules were established. Cuju matches were often held inside the imperial palace. A type of court called ju chang (鞠場) was built especially for cuju matches, which had six crescent-shaped goal posts at each end.

The sport was improved during the Tang Dynasty (618–907). First of all, the feather-stuffed ball was replaced by an air-filled ball with a two-layered hull. Also, two different types of goal posts emerged: One was made by setting up posts with a net between them and the other consisted of just one goal post in the middle of the field. The Tang Dynasty capital of Chang'an was filled with cuju fields, in the backyards of large mansions, and some were even established in the grounds of the palaces. Soldiers who belonged to the imperial army and Gold Bird Guard often formed cuju teams for the delight of the emperor and his court. The level of female cuju teams also improved. Cuju even became popular amongst the scholars and intellectuals, and if a courtier lacked skill in the game, he could pardon himself by acting as a scorekeeper.

Cuju flourished during the Song Dynasty (960–1279) due to social and economic development, extending its popularity to every class in society. At that time, professional cuju players were popular, and the sport began to take on a commercial edge. Professional cuju players fell into two groups: One was trained by and performed for the royal court (unearthed copper mirrors and brush pots from the Song often depict professional performances) and the other consisted of civilians who made a living as cuju players. During this period only one goal post was set up in the center of the field.

It influenced the development in Japan of kemari (蹴鞠), which is still played today on special occasions. The kanji writing (蹴鞠) is the same as for cuju.

Cuju began to decline during the Ming Dynasty (1368–1644) due to neglect, and the 2,000-year-old sport slowly faded away.

Gameplay
Historically, there were two main styles of cuju: zhuqiu and baida.

Zhuqiu was commonly performed at court feasts celebrating the emperor's birthday or during diplomatic events. A competitive cuju match of this type normally consisted of two teams with 12–16 players on each side.

Baida became dominant during the Song Dynasty, a style that attached much importance to developing personal skills. Scoring goals became obsolete when using this method with the playing field enclosed using thread and players taking turns to kick the ball within these set limits. The number of fouls made by the players decided the winner. For example, if the ball was not passed far enough to reach other team members, points were deducted. If the ball was kicked too far out, a large deduction from the score would result. Kicking the ball too low or turning at the wrong moment all led to fewer points. Players could touch the balls of other players with any part of the body except their hands, whilst the number of players ranged anywhere from two to ten. In the end, the player with the highest score won.

Cuju clubs
According to Dongjing Meng Hua Lu, in the 10th century, a cuju league, Qi Yun She (齊雲社) (or Yuan She), was developed in large Chinese cities. Local members were either cuju lovers or professional performers. Non-professional players had to formally appoint a professional as their teacher and pay a fee before becoming members. This process ensured an income for the professionals, unlike cuju of the Tang Dynasty. Qi Yun She organised annual national championships known as Shan Yue Zheng Sai (山岳正賽).

In popular culture
 The Hong Kong TVB series A Change of Destiny featured at least one episode based on the cuju competition. Bagua concepts were also used to jinx the opposing team. However, it followed more of the modern football rules than the ancient rules of the game.
 John Woo's epic film Red Cliff features a cuju competition with Cao Cao and others observing from the sideline.
 The drama The Long Ballad features a cuju competition between the Tang dynasty and the Eastern Turkic Khaganate.
 Korean drama Moon Embracing the Sun featured a chugguk competition.
 Another Korean drama Dream of the Emperor featured a chugguk competition between the Hwarang and royal inspectors while Princess deokman (later Queen Seondeok) was watching and another scene where Kim Chunchu was playing with his grandson.

Cuju revival
The city of Linzi organized a game of cuju for foreigners and locals in period costumes. Brazilian player Kaká played cuju during his tour while visiting China.

See also
 Chinlone
 Episkyros
 Harpastum
 Knattleikr
 La soule
 Sepak takraw
 List of Chinese inventions
 List of China-related topics

Notes

References
 Benn, Charles (2002). China's Golden Age: Everyday Life in the Tang Dynasty. Oxford: Oxford University Press. .
 James, Riordan (1999). Sport and Physical Education in China. London: Spon Press. 
 Osamu Ike (2014). Kemari in Japan''(in Japanese). Kyoto: Mitsumura-Suiko Shoin. 
 Summary in English pp. 181–178. in French pp. 185–182.

External links

 Cuju match to be played in Shandong, September 2004

Ancient sports
Ball games
Chinese ancient games
Sports originating in China
Football in China
Football in Korea
Traditional football